Doddagounipalli is a village in the Hosur taluk of Krishnagiri district, Tamil Nadu, India.

Referenwrongces 

 

Villages in Krishnagiri district